Nagami Dam is a gravity dam located in Shimane Prefecture in Japan. The dam is used for power production. The catchment area of the dam is 108.1 km2. The dam impounds about 6  ha of land when full and can store 359 thousand cubic meters of water. The construction of the dam was completed in 1961.

References

Dams in Shimane Prefecture
1961 establishments in Japan